Sinara may refer to:

 Sinara Group, a Russian investment company
 Sinara, a character in Agents of S.H.I.E.L.D.
 Sinara River, a tributary of the Iset River in Russia

See also
 Senara (disambiguation)
 Cynara (disambiguation)
 Synara San, a character in the animated television series Star Wars Resistance